Andreas Gregor (born 27 April 1955) is a retired German rowing coxswain who had his best achievements in the coxed fours. In this event he won a gold medal at the 1980 Olympics as well as three world titles in 1977, 1978 and 1982. He won another world title in 1983, in coxed pairs. For his Olympic achievement Gregor was awarded the Patriotic Order of Merit in 1980.

References

External links
 
 
 

1955 births
Living people
Rowers from Dresden
People from Bezirk Dresden
East German male rowers
Coxswains (rowing)
Olympic rowers of East Germany
Rowers at the 1980 Summer Olympics
Olympic gold medalists for East Germany
Olympic medalists in rowing
World Rowing Championships medalists for East Germany
Medalists at the 1980 Summer Olympics
Recipients of the Patriotic Order of Merit in silver